Saturday Night is a 1922 American silent romantic comedy film directed by Cecil B. DeMille and starring Leatrice Joy, Conrad Nagel, and Edith Roberts. It was Leatrice Joy's first film with DeMille.

Plot
Shamrock O'Day, a poor laundress dreams of a marrying a rich man. Her neighbour Tom McGuire, the chauffeur of socialite Iris van Suydam, is secretly in love with his mistress. On the other side of the city, Iris is not happy with her pampered life and she dreams of living in a vine-covered cottage. Her rich young fiancé Richard Prentiss is just as tired of women of her class as she is bored with men of his.

When Shamrock comes to deliver laundry at Richard's house, she meets him by chance and he falls in love with her. He proposes to drive her home and tells Iris to wait for him. She decides to go for a picnic with her chauffeur Tom and, after letting her car being crushed by a train, falls into Tom's arms. In the evening, Richard provocatively dances at a formal party with Shamrock, which causes his sister Elsie to announce her brother's engagement to Iris. Tom, having read the announcement in the press wants to leave Iris's service but she tells him she wants to marry him. The fact that her rich uncle clear all her allowances and she is left without a penny does not deter her. As soon as he hears the news, Richard decides to marry Shamrock.

Soon, Shamrock, who feels she is despised by Richard's family and friends is almost as desperate as Iris who must live in a tiny apartment next to a railway and spend her time cooking and cleaning. She decides to hire Tom as her chauffeur despite Richard and Iris's opposition. One evening, they go together to Coney Island. When they come back, they find Richard and Iris waiting for them. Iris tells Richard they are too different to live together. While Richard and Iris try to persuade their spouses that they love them, a fire breaks out. Richard saves Iris's life.

Seven years later, Shamrock and Tom are happily married and have several children, while Richard and Iris are still pondering whether it is time to mend their broken engagement.

Cast

 Leatrice Joy as Iris Van Suydam
 Conrad Nagel as Richard Prentiss
 Edith Roberts as Shamrock O'Day
 Jack Mower as Tom McGuire
 Julia Faye as Elsie Prentiss
 Edythe Chapman as Mrs. Prentiss
 Theodore Roberts as Uncle
 Sylvia Ashton as Mrs. O'Day
 John Davidson as The Count Demitry Scardoff
 James Neill as Tompkins
 Winter Hall as The Professor
 Lillian Leighton as Mrs. Ferguson
 William Boyd (uncredited)
 Viora Daniel (uncredited)

Preservation
A print of the film is held in the Indiana University Bloomington film collection, and it has been released on DVD.

References

External links

1922 films
1922 romantic comedy films
American romantic comedy films
American silent feature films
American black-and-white films
Famous Players-Lasky films
Films shot in California
Films directed by Cecil B. DeMille
Paramount Pictures films
1920s American films
Silent romantic comedy films
Silent American comedy films
1920s English-language films